Beni Semiel is a town and commune in Tlemcen Province in northwestern Algeria.

References

http://static.cdn.ea.com/fifa/u/f/fifa12_demo_install_eu.zip

Communes of Tlemcen Province